Ty the Tasmanian Tiger 4 is a side-scrolling platform video game developed and published by Krome Studios. Unlike its predecessors, the game plays as a 2D side-scrolling platformer, similar to the games in the series released for the Game Boy Advance.

Gameplay 
Ty the Tasmanian Tiger 4 retains various elements from previous games in the series, such as collecting opals and acquiring new boomerangs to use as weapons. The gameplay has shifted towards a 2-dimensional side-scroller style, very similar to the Game Boy Advance versions of the game's two prequels, with an adventure spanning over 40 levels. Unlike in previous games, the player gets to play as multiple characters from the Bush Rescue team, including Ty, Sly, Shazza and Dennis, as they travel through the various areas in Burramudgee.

Plot 
After saving Southern Rivers from the plight of the Quinkan in the previous game, Ty and the Bush Rescue team have since regrouped and relocated their headquarters to the town of "Coolarangah" on the shores of Lake Burramudgee. Recently, Ty's old cassowary nemesis Boss Cass set up a resort island named "Cassablanca," which leads into a series of strange occurrences including a shadowy figure lurking around the town.

Reception 

Ty the Tasmanian Tiger 4 received mixed to positive reviews.  Notably, the game did not receive as much coverage as the three preceding games.  Points of contention include the game's short length, lack of innovation, and a what is felt to be a noticeable downgrade from 3D to 2D.  Another issue was that the previous 2D entries in the series, which were on the Gameboy Advance, were more fun.

References 

2015 video games
Krome Studios games
Side-scrolling platform games
Ty the Tasmanian Tiger
Video games developed in Australia
Video games set in Australia
Windows games
Windows-only games
Single-player video games